Izabela Lupulesku (born 7 November 1999) is a Serbian table tennis player. Her highest career ITTF ranking was 89.

References

1999 births
Living people
Serbian female table tennis players
Mediterranean Games competitors for Serbia
Competitors at the 2022 Mediterranean Games